Amangeldy Abdyrahmanuly Aytaly (10 September 1939 – 21 December 2022) was a Kazakh academic and politician. A member of the Agrarian and Civic Union of Workers Bloc, he served in the Mäjilis from 1999 to 2007.

Aytaly died on 21 December 2022, at the age of 83.

References

1939 births
2022 deaths
Kazakhstani politicians
Members of the Mazhilis
Al-Farabi Kazakh National University alumni
Recipients of the Order of Parasat
People from Volgograd Oblast